Steven Sainz (born July 13, 1994) is a Republican member of the Georgia House of Representatives. He represents Georgia's District 180 and has been in office since January 14, 2019.

Before his election, Sainz was the Executive Director of Camden Family Connection, a Georgian nonprofit organization.

Sainz was twenty-three years old when he launched his campaign. He ran unopposed in the 2018 general election after defeating incumbent candidate Jason Spencer in the Republican primary. Spencer was facing criticism at the time for proposing a bill that would ban face coverings such as hijabs, as well as for making controversial comments on the television series Who is America?.

Sainz was subsequently re-elected to his position in 2020 and 2022. He is of Cuban and Costa Rican descent. He is one of three Hispanic Republicans in the Georgia State Legislature, the other two being Jason Anavitarte and Rey Martinez.

References

Living people
Costa Rican emigrants to the United States
People from Camden County, Georgia
21st-century American politicians
Republican Party members of the Georgia House of Representatives
1994 births
American people of Costa Rican descent
American politicians of Costa Rican descent
Hispanic and Latino American state legislators in Georgia (U.S. state)